Romeo "Meo" Sacchetti (born August 20, 1953) is an Italian professional basketball coach and former player who is currently a head coach for Pallacanestro Cantù of the Serie A2.

Standing at a height of 1.99 m (6 ft. 6 in.), he played as a power forward. He won the silver medal with his national team at the 1980 Summer Olympic Games in Moscow.

Playing career

Club playing career
At the club level, Sacchetti  played for the Italian teams Saclà Asti, Fernet Tonic Bologna (1976–1979, also known as Amaro Harrys Bologna, in Serie A2 in the 1976–77 season), Grimaldi Torino (1979–1984, also known as Berloni Torino), and Ciao Crem Varese (1984–1991, also known as Divarese Varese and Ranger Varese).

Italian national team
Sacchetti was a member of the senior men's Italian national basketball team. With Italy's senior national team, he won a silver medal at the 1980 Summer Olympics. He also won a gold medal at the EuroBasket 1983, and a bronze medal at the EuroBasket 1985.

He also played at the 1984 Summer Olympics, and at the 1986 FIBA World Championship.

Coaching career

Clubs
Sacchetti began his coaching career in 1996. While he was the head coach of Dinamo Sassari, he was named the Italian League Coach of the Year in 2012. He won the Italian Cup in 2014 and 2015. He also won the Italian Supercup in 2014, and the Italian League championship in 2015.

Italian senior national team
In 2017, he was named the head coach of the senior men's Italian national basketball team.

Personal
Sacchetti's son, Brian Sacchetti, is a professional basketball player. Sacchetti coached his son Brian, while Brian was a player of Dinamo Sassari.

References

External links
Official website 
FIBA Profile
FIBA Europe Profile
Euroleague.net Coach Profile
Italian League Player Profile 
Italian League Coach Profile 

1953 births
Living people
Auxilium Pallacanestro Torino coaches
Auxilium Pallacanestro Torino players
Basketball players at the 1980 Summer Olympics
Basketball players at the 1984 Summer Olympics
Dinamo Sassari coaches
Fabriano Basket coaches
FIBA EuroBasket-winning players
Italian basketball coaches
Italian men's basketball players
Libertas Pallacanestro Asti players
Medalists at the 1980 Summer Olympics
New Basket Brindisi coaches
Olympic basketball players of Italy
Olympic coaches
Olympic medalists in basketball
Olympic silver medalists for Italy
Orlandina Basket coaches
Pallacanestro Varese players
Pallalcesto Amatori Udine coaches
People from Altamura
Power forwards (basketball)
Vanoli Basket coaches
1986 FIBA World Championship players
Sportspeople from the Metropolitan City of Bari